Carlos Agostí (July 3, 1922 – December 13, 2002) was a Spanish-born Mexican film actor.

Selected filmography
 When the Angels Sleep (1947)
 The Drummer of Bruch (1948)
 In a Corner of Spain (1949)
 Don Juan (1950)
 Malibran's Song (1951)
 The Hidden One (1955) 
 Dos Corazones y un Cielo (1958)
 Sube y baja (1959)
 The Illiterate One (1961)
 The Bloody Vampire (1962)
 La Valentina (1966)
 Juan Pistolas (1966)
 The Garden of Aunt Isabel (1971)
 41, el hombre perfecto (1982)

References

External links

20th-century Mexican male actors
Spanish emigrants to Mexico
Golden Age of Mexican cinema
Male actors from Madrid
1922 births
2002 deaths